Eupithecia discolor is a moth in the family Geometridae. It is found in Nepal.

Taxonomy
Inoue synonymised this species with Eupithecia rubridorsata in 2000. Further research concluded that it is in fact a good species.

References

Moths described in 1983
discolor
Moths of Asia